A tactile sensor is a device that measures information arising from physical interaction with its environment. Tactile sensors are generally modeled after the biological sense of cutaneous touch which is capable of detecting stimuli resulting from mechanical stimulation, temperature, and pain (although pain sensing is not common in artificial tactile sensors). Tactile sensors are used in robotics, computer hardware and security systems. A common application of tactile sensors is in touchscreen devices on mobile phones and computing.

Tactile sensors may be of different types including piezoresistive, piezoelectric, optical, capacitive and elastoresistive sensors.

Uses
Tactile sensors appear in everyday life such as elevator buttons and lamps which dim or brighten by touching the base. There are also innumerable other applications for tactile sensors of which most people are never aware.

Sensors that measure very small changes must have very high sensitivities. Sensors need to be designed to have a small effect on what is measured; making the sensor smaller often improves this and may introduce other advantages. Tactile sensors can be used to test the performance of all types of applications. For example, these sensors have been used in the manufacturing of automobiles (brakes, clutches, door seals, gasket), battery lamination, bolted joints, fuel cells etc.

Tactile imaging, as a medical imaging modality, translating the sense of touch into a digital image is based on the tactile sensors. Tactile imaging closely mimics manual palpation, since the probe of the device with a pressure sensor array mounted on its face acts similar to human fingers during clinical examination, deforming soft tissue by the probe and detecting resulting changes in the pressure pattern.

Robots designed to interact with objects requiring handling involving precision, dexterity, or interaction with unusual objects, need sensory apparatus which is functionally equivalent to a human's tactile ability. Tactile sensors have been developed for use with robots. Tactile sensors can complement visual systems by providing added information when the robot begins to grip an object. At this time vision is no longer sufficient, as the mechanical properties of the object cannot be determined by vision alone. Determining weight, texture, stiffness, center of mass, coefficient of friction, and thermal conductivity require object interaction and some sort of tactile sensing.
 
Several classes of tactile sensors are used in robots of different kinds, for tasks spanning collision avoidance and manipulation. Some methods for simultaneous localization and mapping are based on tactile sensors.

Pressure sensor arrays
Pressure sensor arrays are large grids of tactels. A "tactel" is a 'tactile element'. Each tactel is capable of detecting normal forces. Tactel-based sensors provide a high resolution 'image' of the contact surface. Alongside spatial resolution and force sensitivity, systems-integration questions such as wiring and signal routing are important. Pressure sensor arrays are available in thin-film form. They are primarily used as analytical tools used in the manufacturing and R&D processes by engineers and technicians, and have been adapted for use in robots. Examples of such sensors available to consumers include arrays built from conductive rubber, lead zirconate titanate (PZT), polyvinylidene fluoride(PVDF), PVDF-TrFE, FET, and metallic capacitive sensing elements.

Optically-based tactile sensors
Several kinds of tactile sensors have been developed that take advantage of camera-like technology to provide high-resolution data.
A key exemplar is the Gelsight technology first developed at MIT which uses a camera behind an opaque gel layer to
achieve high-resolution tactile feedback.  The Samsung ``See-through-your-skin (STS) sensor uses a semi-transparent gel to produce combined tactile and optical imaging.

Strain gauge rosettes
Strain gauges rosettes are constructed from multiple strain gauges, with each gauge detecting the force in a particular direction. When the information from each strain gauge is combined, the information allows determination of a pattern of forces or torques.

Biologically inspired tactile sensors
A variety of biologically inspired designs have been suggested ranging from simple whisker-like sensors which measure only one point at a time  through more advanced fingertip-like sensors, to complete skin-like sensors as on the latest iCub. Biologically inspired tactile sensors often incorporate more than one sensing strategy. For example, they might detect both the distribution of pressures, and the pattern of forces that would come from pressure sensor arrays and strain gauge rosettes, allowing two-point discrimination and force sensing, with human-like ability.

Advanced versions of biologically designed tactile sensors include vibration sensing which has been determined to be important for understanding interactions between the tactile sensor and objects where the sensor slides over the object. Such interactions are now understood to be important for human tool use and judging the texture of an object. One such sensor combines force sensing, vibration sensing, and heat transfer sensing.

DIY and open-hardware tactile sensors
Recently, a sophisticated tactile sensor has been made open-hardware, enabling enthusiasts and hobbyists to experiment with an otherwise expensive technology. Furthermore, with the advent of cheap optical cameras, novel sensors have been proposed which can be built easily and cheaply with a 3D printer.

See also
 Tactile technology
 List of sensors
 Pressure measurement
 Sensitivity
 Touch sensor
 Transducer
 Tactile imaging

References

External links
 Automation and Robotics
 Tactile/Touch and Resistive Based Sensors

Transducers